The Ulla (río Ulla in Galician and Spanish) is a river in Galicia, Spain.

Its source is sometimes given as Antas de Ulla and sometimes the neighbouring municipality of Monterroso.  It flows to Ría de Arosa. 
Its basin is the largest in Galicia after the Minho River. Tributaries include the rivers Deza and Arnego.

The river is also valued by archaeologists owing to the large number of artifacts, dating as far back as the Neolithic, discovered here. The outlet of the Ulla River and the mouth of the estuary, called Ría de Arousa, are the two sites where archaeologists have discovered remains consistently. Rock carvings have been discovered here. The Ulla River is also important because it is the river in the northwest of the Iberian Peninsula to produce a large number of watery hoards, which were discovered in its lower reaches and its mouth.

Etymology 
According to E. Bascuas, "Ulla" is a form belonging to the old European hydronymy, and derived from the Indoeuropean  root *wel- 'wheel, rotate'. This toponym is registered in 906 as "(fluvius) Volia", which had derived from a previous form *Wulia.

See also 
 List of rivers of Spain
 Rivers of Galicia

References

External links

 photos

Rivers of Spain
Rivers of Galicia (Spain)